Azerbaijan made its Paralympic Games début at the 1996 Summer Paralympics in Atlanta, with a two-man delegation to compete in track and field and powerlifting. It has taken part in every subsequent edition of the Summer Paralympics. The country made its debut at the Winter Paralympics in 2022.

Medals

Medals by Summer Games

Medals by Winter Games

Medals by Summer Sport

Medals by Winter Sport

Medallists

See also
 Azerbaijan at the Olympics

References

 
Paralympics